Bylice  is a village in the administrative district of Gmina Świercze, within Pułtusk County, Masovian Voivodeship, in east-central Poland.

References

Bylice